= Mark Harwell =

American biologist

Mark A. Harwell is an American biologist currently at Texas A&M University and an Elected Fellow of the American Association for the Advancement of Science.
